The second season of Solsidan, a Swedish television comedy series, created by comedian and actor Felix Herngren, Jacob Seth Fransson, Ulf Kvensler and Pontus Edgren, premiered on January 16, 2011 on TV4 and will end on March 20, 2011. This season will feature the wedding between Alex and Anna and Anna's parents will appear, her dad is a military and her mom an ex-beauty queen. Over all, Anna and Mickan will be the main-characters for a greater part of the show. Also, Alex neighbor Tord Malmberg will appear more since he is getting together with Alex's mom Margareta.

The episodes of the second season is posted on TV4 Play Premium, a pay on demand service by TV4, on Fridays and is aired on Sundays. The Finnish TV-channel FST5 was at the beginning airing the episodes two days before their original air date in Sweden, this caused great legal trouble for the Finnish network who was forced to stop that and air the episodes at the same time as TV4.

The first episode was seen by 2,530,000 viewers in Sweden, that's the highest rating that TV4 has had in over a decade. One week after the airing had 3,2 million people seen it, then included the re-run and all web-views.

On December 3, 2010, the producers announced that the script to the series had been sold to the American network ABC, which plans to create their own version of the series to air in the United States.

Plot
Alex and Anna have just moved into a new house in Solsidan since their old house had some mold trouble. Alex has decided to ask Anna to marry him but as problems finding the perfect moment to pop the question. Anna has begun working as a masseuse again and to get some practice she offered Mickan a free massage, but Mickan forgets and Fredde has to take her place, which makes him really uncomfortable. When Alex finally has decided how to propose to Anna, Ove Sundbergs shows up and destroys the moment. Alex planned a romantic picnic by the sea with a choir showing up in the background when he asks Anna. But Ove refuses to leave the spot that Alex has chosen, but at the end Alex doesn't care and proposes to Anna in front of Ove and she says "yes".

Fredde and Mickan get a nanny, Mickan isn't pleased with her because she thinks that Fredde stares at her boobs too much, and she gets a new older lady instead. But it seems like she and Fredde has a lot in common and are getting along a little to well so she firers her as well and hires a third nanny, a homosexual man. Mickan has figured out a way to save money, she buys clothes, furniture and such and then return them after she has used them. It drives Fredde crazy since it's he who has to spend his weekend returning all the stuff.

Fredde's old childhood tormentor, Kristian, is now together with Lussan, Mickan's best friend and is moving back to Solsidan from  Géneve, where he has lived until now. Alex tries to calm Fredde down by saying that Fredde at least is the wealthiest man in Solsidan and has a wonderful family. It then shows that Kristian owns around 22 billion Swedish kronor and is among the richest Swedes. Fredde doesn't know what to do, he is no longer the wealthiest man in Solsidan. To get back at Kristian he introduces him to Ove Sundberg, who absolutely wants to become friend with a billionaire.

Alex feels that he and Anna has an unfair way of dividing the households chores and wants to introduce a new currency to be able to buy himself free when you have collected enough money. Anna has a negative feeling about it and it all falls apart when she demands household money for sex.

Reception

Ratings
The first episode of the second season broke all viewing records and was seen by the entire 2.53 million viewers in Sweden. This is the highest rating TV4 had in ten years, except for two episodes of Let's Dance, which came up in the same level. In Finland, the first episode was viewed by 100 000 viewers. After one week, 3.2 million had seen the first episode in Sweden, then also included any person who has recorded, viewed on the Web or watched the first replay. 

The second episode dropped a bit but was still seen by over two million, to be exact 2.31 million. The episode was highlighted in the UK for the false domestic currency as Alex and Anna introduced, "uscados ". British Sky News wrote about the series which according to them is seen by a full 25% of the population.

Cast
The second season has five main characters as well as several recurring characters:

Alex Löfström (Felix Herngren)
Anna Svensson (Mia Skäringer)
Fredde Schiller (Johan Rheborg)
Mickan Schiller (Josephine Bornebusch)
Ove Sundberg (Henrik Dorsin)
Anette Sundberg (Malin Cederbladh)
Margareta Löfström (Mona Malm)
Lussan (Rebecka Englund)
Palle Svensson (Magnus Krepper)
Victor Schiller (Leonardo Rojas Lundgren)
Ebba Schiller (Ester Granholm and Otilia Anttila)

Episodes

References

External links
Official website
Solsidan on Facebook

2011 Swedish television seasons
2